María Mercedes "Merche" Peris Minguet (born 5 January 1985 in Paiporta, Valencia, Spain) is an Olympic and national record holding backstroke swimmer from Spain. She competed for Spain at the 2008 Olympics.

Notes

References

External links
 
 
 
 

1985 births
Living people
Spanish female backstroke swimmers
Swimmers at the 2008 Summer Olympics
Sportspeople from Valencia
Olympic swimmers of Spain
Medalists at the FINA World Swimming Championships (25 m)
European Aquatics Championships medalists in swimming
Mediterranean Games silver medalists for Spain
Mediterranean Games bronze medalists for Spain
Swimmers at the 2005 Mediterranean Games
Mediterranean Games medalists in swimming